John Sweet may refer to:

John Sweet (actor) (1916–2011), US Army sergeant serving in the UK in World War II and actor in A Canterbury Tale
John Edison Sweet (1832–1916), American mechanical engineer who built the first micrometer caliper 
John Hyde Sweet (1880–1964), U.S. Representative from Nebraska
John Sweet (canoeist), American slalom canoer who competed in the early 1980s